is a national highway of Japan connecting Kita-ku, Osaka and Kameoka, Kyoto in the Kansai region of Japan.

Route description

Minō Toll Road

The Minō Toll Road is a  two-lane toll road in Minoh, Osaka that connects the Shin-Meishin Expressway to the southern limits of the city via a tunnel under Mount Minō. It is a part of Route 423 that is tolled and maintained by the Osaka Prefectural Road Corporation.

Shinmidō-suji

The Shinmidō-suji is a  controlled-access highway that runs from the northern terminus of the Midōsuji in Kita-ku to the southern terminus of the Minō Toll Road in Minoh. From Kita-ku to Toyonaka, the median of the highway is utilized by the Midōsuji Line and Kita-Osaka Kyuko Railway.

History
Much of what is now National Route 423 was part of the Settan-kaido, a road linking Ikeda in what was Settsu Province and Kameoka in what was then Tanba Province. 

In 1964, the portion of the route between Kita-ku and Osaka Prefecture Route 9, known as the Shinmidō-suji, was built alongside the extended Midōsuji Line to accommodate automobile traffic from Shin-Ōsaka Station into central Osaka. Later in the decade, Shinmidō-suji was extended north again along with the Midōsuji Line to Suita were the venue for the Expo '70 was. National Route 423 was established in 1982 along the Shinmidō-suji, the planned Minō Toll Road, and the older Settan-kaido.

The Minō Toll Road section was opened to traffic on 30 May 2007 between Osaka Route 9 and the northern terminus at the Ikeda–Minoh route of National Route 423, completing the route. On 10 December 2017 the highway was connected to the Shin-Meishin Expressway at the northern terminus of the Ikeda–Minoh route and the toll road.

List of major junctions

Ikeda–Minoh route
The entire toll road is in Osaka Prefecture.

|colspan="8" style="text-align: center;"|Through to

References

See also
Minō Toll Road

National highways in Japan
Regional High-Standard Highways in Japan
Roads in Osaka Prefecture
Roads in Kyoto Prefecture